Grand Rapids Township may refer to:

 Grand Rapids Township, LaSalle County, Illinois
 Grand Rapids Charter Township, Michigan
 Grand Rapids Township, Itasca County, Minnesota
 Grand Rapids Township, LaMoure County, North Dakota, a township in LaMoure County
 Grand Rapids Township, Wood County, Ohio

Township name disambiguation pages